The Diocese of Derry and Raphoe is a diocese of the Church of Ireland in the north-west of Ireland. It is in the ecclesiastical province of Armagh. Its geographical remit straddles two civil jurisdictions: in Northern Ireland, it covers all of County Londonderry and large parts of County Tyrone while in the Republic of Ireland it covers County Donegal.

Overview and history

After the Church in England broke communion with the Catholic Church, by decree of the Irish Parliament, the Church of Ireland became the Established Church in the Kingdom of Ireland.  The English-speaking minority mostly adhered to the Church of Ireland or to Presbyterianism, while the Roman Catholic Church undertook extensive mission work and retained the allegiance of the majority of the population in Ireland as a whole. From the 1830s onwards, many Anglican dioceses were merged, in view of declining membership. The sees of Derry and Raphoe were united in 1834. It is for this reason that the united diocese has two cathedrals.

Cathedrals
 The Cathedral Church of St Columb, Derry, Northern Ireland.
 The Cathedral Church of St Eunan, Raphoe, County Donegal, Republic of Ireland.

List of Bishops

The following is a basic list the bishops.

 1831–1853: Richard Ponsonby
 1853–1867: William Higgin
 1867–1896: William Alexander
 1896–1916: George Alexander Chadwick
 1916–1944: Joseph Irvine Peacocke
 1945–1958: Robert McNeil Boyd
 1958–1969: Charles John Tyndall
 1970–1975: Cuthbert Irvine Peacocke
 1975–1980: Robert "Robin" Eames
 1980–2002: James Mehaffey
 2002–2019: Right Reverend Kenneth (Ken) Raymond Good
 2019–present: Andrew Forster

See also

 List of Anglican dioceses in the United Kingdom and Ireland
 Roman Catholic Diocese of Derry
 Roman Catholic Diocese of Raphoe
 Plantation of Ulster

References

External links
Diocesan homepage

 
Derry and Raphoe
Religion in County Londonderry
Religion in County Donegal
Religion in County Tyrone
Church of Ireland in the Republic of Ireland